"The Combine Harvester" is a novelty song which was a number one hit for Brendan Grace in Ireland in 1975 and then also for The Wurzels in the UK in 1976.  Written by Brendan O'Shaughnessy, the song is a parody of Melanie Safka's 1971 hit, "Brand New Key", with rustic lyrics replacing the original theme of roller-skating.

In the UK the song was released by The Wurzels, a band from Somerset with a rustic West Country style which they called "Scrumpy and Western".  It reached number one on 12 June 1976 and stayed there for two weeks.

Charts

References

1975 songs
1975 singles
1976 singles
Novelty songs
UK Singles Chart number-one singles
EMI Records singles
Songs about farmers
Irish Singles Chart number-one singles